Herbolzheim is a town in the district of Emmendingen, in Baden-Württemberg, Germany. It is situated near the river Elz, 26 km north of Freiburg.

References

External links
  Official Webpage
  Herbolzheim: History and images 

Emmendingen (district)